Vasyl Ilich Symchych (January 8, 1915 – March 1, 1978) was a Ukrainian actor.

Symchych was born in Seredniy Bereziv, Kolomya powiat, Austro-Hungary (today Ivano-Frankivsk Oblast) and died in March 1978 at the age of 63.

Partial filmography 

1955: Ivan Franko ("Іван Фpaнкo") (Ukrainian SSR)
1964: Tsari - Andrey Romanovich, teacher
1968: Annychka ("Анничка") (Ukrainian SSR) - Semen
1968: Zakhar Berkut ("Зaxap Бepкут") (Ukrainian SSR) - Zakhar Berkut
1968: The Stone Cross (Камінний хрест) (Ukrainian SSR) - Georgi
1971: The White Bird Marked with Black ("Білий птах з чорною ознакою") (Ukrainian SSR) - Father Myron
1972: Zozulya s diplomom - Granpa Karpo
1972: The Lost Deed ("Пропала грамота") (Ukrainian SSR) - the father of cossack Vasyl
1972: Defying Everybody ("Наперекор всему")
1973: Naperekor vsemu - Slijepi starac 
1973: Posledniy gaiduk - Pastukh
1973: Svadba
1973: To the last minute ("Дo последней минуты") - pai Meletiy Budzinovsky
1973: Did Livogo Kraynogo - Maksym Besarab
1974: Do posledney minuty - Budzinovskiy
1974: The Deluge ("Potop") (Poland)
1974: Esli khochesh byt schastlivym - Sergey Aleksandrovich
1974: Velnio nuotaka - Baltaragis
1975: Perskeltas dangus
1975: Povest o zhenshchine - Nechay
1976: Gypsies Are Found Near Heaven ("Табор уходит в небо") (Moldavian SSR) - Balint
1978: Duma o Kovpake: Karpaty, Karpaty... - Ivanochko
1978: A Hunting Accident ("Мoй ласковый и нeжный звeрь") - Nikolay Skortsov
1978: Vospominaniye... - (final film role)

References 
 

1915 births
1978 deaths
People from Ivano-Frankivsk Oblast
People from the Kingdom of Galicia and Lodomeria
Ukrainian Austro-Hungarians
Ukrainian male film actors
20th-century Ukrainian male actors
Soviet male film actors